Kaili is an Austronesian dialect cluster of the Celebic branch, and is one of the principal languages of Central Sulawesi.  The heartland of the Kaili area is the broad Palu River valley which stretches southward from Central Sulawesi's capital city, Palu.  Kaili is also spoken in the mountains which rise on both sides of this valley, and along the coasts of the Makassar Strait and the Gulf of Tomini.

Dialects 

Taking a fine-grade view, it is possible to distinguish sixteen regional varieties of Kaili.  Following the practice of Kaili people themselves, each variety is named after its negator.  For example, in the Tawaili region northeast of Palu, Kaili speakers use rai as their word for 'no,' while speakers in the Parigi region on the Gulf of Tomini use tara.  These two varieties can be referred to as 'Kaili Rai' and 'Kaili Tara,' irrespective of whether one intends for these varieties to be regarded as languages, dialects, or subdialects.  These varieties can also be referred to as 'Tawaili' and 'Parigi.'

The following table is a list of lowest-level Kaili varieties, presented by negator and alternate name(s) by which each has been known.

Classification of Kaili varieties

Adriani 1914 
The linguist Nicolaus Adriani recognized eight languages.  In this early work, several Kaili varieties were as yet unknown to the author.
 Tawaili  (= Rai)
 Palu  (= Ledo)
 Lole  (= Unde)
 Ganti  (= Ndepuu)
 Sigi  (= Ija)
 Pakuli  (= Ado, Edo)
 Parigi  (= Tara)
 Sausu  (= Ta’a)

Esser 1938 
The linguist S. J. Esser divided Kaili into western, central and eastern groups.  Esser was unclear whether his divisions represented dialects or languages, but Noorduyn concluded he intended one language with three principal dialects.
 West Kaili  (= Ende, Tado, Inde, Da’a, Unde, Ndepuu)
 Central Kaili  (= Ledo, Ado, Edo, Ija, Taa) 
 East Kaili  (= Rai, Tara, Ta’a)

Kruyt 1938 
Using anthropological rather than linguistic criteria, Alb. C. Kruyt divided peoples of this area into three 'rings' or 'circles.'
 Pakawa ring  (= Ende, Tado, Inde, Da’a)
 Kaili ring  (= Unde, Ndepuu, Rai, Tara, Ta’a, Doi, Ledo)
 Sigi ring  (= Ado, Edo, Ija, Taa)

Barr and Barr 1979 
Barr and Barr recognized one language with six dialects (they also included Kulawi as a seventh dialect, but left Ende and Tado out of consideration since those varieties are not spoken in Central Sulawesi).
 Pekava  (= Inde, Da’a)
 Banava  (= Unde, Ndepuu)
 Tawaili-Sindue  (= Rai)
 Parigi  (= Tara, Ta’a)
 Palu  (= Doi, Ledo)
 Sigi ( = Ado, Edo, Ija, Taa)

Ethnologue 2009 
The Ethnologue (16th ed., 2009) recognizes four languages.  In this subclassification, Kaili Ledo is best regarded as an 'everything else' category 'awaiting further research.'  
 Baras  (= Ende)
 Kaili Ledo  (= Raio, Rai, Tara, Ta’a, Doi, Ledo, Ado, Edo, Ija, Taa)
 Kaili Unde  (= Unde, Ndepuu)

Notes 

Kaili–Pamona languages
Languages of Sulawesi